Phra Yuen is a district (amphoe) of Khon Kaen province, northeastern Thailand.

History
The minor district (king amphoe) Phra Yuen was established on 18 October 1976 by splitting off the three tambons: Phra Yuen, Phra Bu, and Ban Ton from Mueang Khon Kaen district. On 1 January 1988 it was upgraded to a full district.

Geography
Neighboring districts are (from the north clockwise): Ban Fang, Mueang Khon Kaen, Ban Haet and Mancha Khiri.

Administration
The district is divided into five subdistricts (tambons), which are further subdivided into 46 villages (mubans). There are two townships (thesaban tambons): Ban Ton covers tambon Ban Ton, and Phra Yuen covers parts of tambon Phra Yuen. There are a further four tambon administrative organizations (TAO).

References

External links
amphoe.com

Phra Yuen